Faris Scherwiz is a fictional character in the Final Fantasy series. She first appears in Final Fantasy V as an early antagonist and later one of its protagonists. She was born Princess Sarisa Scherwil Tycoon, but was lost at sea and raised as a boy by pirates. She joins the group, hoping to understand why protagonist Lenna Charlotte Tycoon has the same pendant as her. She was created by Hironobu Sakaguchi and was based on the protagonist of the manga Princess Knight. Her promotional artwork was created by Yoshitaka Amano.

In the first English version of Final Fantasy V, she spoke with a pirate accent, which was changed in the Game Boy Advance port of Final Fantasy V. The accent was the subject of criticism. Faris was otherwise well-received, identified as a standout of the game's cast and a strong female character.

Concept and creation
Faris Scherwiz is a pirate captain who was created as a protagonist for Final Fantasy V by Hironobu Sakaguchi, who based the idea of her being a Princess disguised as a man on the manga Princess Knight. Her promotional artwork was created by Yoshitaka Amano, who identifies her as one of his favorite works. In the Japanese version, Faris uses the masculine pronoun ore to present a tough and masculine image. Unlike the Japanese version, the first official English translation in the PlayStation version of Final Fantasy V featured in Final Fantasy Anthology had her speak in a pirate accent. This was changed in the Game Boy Advance port. She is voiced by Rie Tanaka in the Japanese version of World of Final Fantasy and by Emily O'Brien in the English version.

Appearances

Faris first appears in Final Fantasy V, where she is the captain of a pirate ship disguised as a man. Before the events of Final Fantasy V, she was raised as Sarisa Scherwil Tycoon, the daughter of King Alexander Highwind Tycoon and sister of Lenna Charlotte Tycoon. She is lost at sea at a young age and discovered by pirates, who name her Faris after she has trouble pronouncing her name. She befriends a sea dragon named Syldra who helps move her ship without wind. Protagonists Bartz Klauser, Lenna Charlotte Tycoon, and Galuf Doe attempt to steal her ship in order to find and protect three Crystals after a first has already been shattered. She captures them and tries to hold Lenna ransom due to her being royalty, but decides to help them find the Wind Crystal when she realizes that she and Lenna share the same pendant. Faris becomes one of the Warriors of Light along with the other protagonists to protect the other Crystals. Syldra protects Faris from an attack and is lost at sea, causing Faris grief and forcing them to find another means of transportation. Her true gender is discovered by Bartz and Galuf. She is later shown a vision of someone she cares about, who turns out to be King Tycoon, leading her to suspect that she and Lenna are related.

The second Crystal is shattered, and Syldra appears to rescue them, but Syldra's wounds are too great and she drifts into the current. They attempt to save the Fire Crystal but are unable to do so. Faris tells Lenna that they are sisters, and they discover King Tycoon on their way to find the Earth Crystal. Tycoon then proceeds to attack the group. They are saved by Galuf's granddaughter Krile who brings him to his senses. The Earth Crystal shatters and releases antagonist Exdeath, leading the King to sacrifice himself to protect the group. Faris battles against Exdeath in another world, where he shatters that world's Crystals and kills Galuf. Faris wakes up in Tycoon Castle where her return is celebrated, but she dislikes this and she and Lenna reunite with Bartz and Krile. She also discovers Syldra's spirit, who grants Faris the power to summon her. They battle against Exdeath and their spirit reforms the Crystals to bring back peace to the worlds. Faris returns to Tycoon Castle to serve as Queen, but soon returns to a life of piracy. She reunites with the other Warriors of Light years later.

She has appeared as a playable character in Theatrhythm Final Fantasy, Dissidia Final Fantasy: Opera Omnia, and Final Fantasy Record Keeper. She appears in World of Final Fantasy as a supporting character.

Reception
Since appearing in Final Fantasy V, Faris has received positive reception, particularly as a female video game character. In a Japanese poll on players' favorite Final Fantasy women, Faris ranked eighth, tied with Garnet from Final Fantasy IX. She is also regarded as the most memorable and interesting character in Final Fantasy V by Heidi Kemp of GamesRadar+, author Chris Kohler, and IGN staff, the latter which identified her as the 11th best Final Fantasy character. Marshall Lemon of Escapist Magazine also regarded Faris highly among its cast, questioning why she does not have her own game. Nintendojo staff ranked her as among the best female video game heroines due to her physical strength, valor, and defiance of stereotypes as a woman and princess. The discovery that Faris was a woman made Derek Heemsbergen of RPGFan like her more than they already did. Shayera the Starsword of RPGamer enjoyed her character archetype and noting her as an exception to a lack of cool female characters in Final Fantasy. Chad Concelmo of Destructoid praised Faris' outfit for being an interesting spin on pirate's garb and for being complex in a similar way to Faris. They took issue however with the raised collar and "too-high boots".

Her pirate accent in the PlayStation release of Final Fantasy V was controversial for not matching the original Japanese dialogue. Writers Aaron Lakuszka, Jeremy Parish, and Joe Juba for Nintendo World Report, 1UP.com, and Game Informer respectively particularly appreciated the English version of Final Fantasy V Advance for removing this aspect of her dialogue and found it one of its highlights.

References

Female characters in video games
Fictional cross-dressers
Fictional explorers in video games
Fictional helmsmen
Fictional pirates in video games
Fictional sea captains
Final Fantasy characters
Final Fantasy V
Orphan characters in video games
Princess characters in video games
Square Enix protagonists
Video game characters introduced in 1992
Woman soldier and warrior characters in video games